Camillo Vitelli (c. 1459 - May 1496) was an Italian knight and condottiero of the Vitelli family. He was born in Città di Castello as the son of Niccolò, making him brother to Paolo, Giulio, Giovanni and Vitellozzo. He was also brother-in-law to Giampaolo Baglioni. He became marquess of Sant'Angelo dei Lombardi and duke of Gravina in Puglia. In a battle near Lucera he became the first person to use an arquebus on horseback. He died in Circello and was the father of Vitello Vitelli, another condottiero.

References

Bibliography (in Italian) 
 Giulio Roscio, Ritratti et dogii di capitani illustri, che ne secoli moderni hanno gloriosamente guerreggiato, Roma, 1646
 Ariodante Fabretti, Cronaca della Città di Perugia dal 1309 al 1491, Nota col nome di Diario del Graziani, 1850.

Counts of Italy
People from Città di Castello
15th-century condottieri
1459 births
1496 deaths